Johan Nyström may refer to:

 Johan Nyström (athlete) (1874–1968), Swedish Olympic track and field athlete 
 Johan Nyström (swimmer) (born 1975), Swedish swimmer
 Johan Nyström (weightlifter) (born 1983), Finnish weightlifter
 John W. Nystrom, born Johan Vilhelm Nyström (1825–1885), American civil engineer, inventor and author